Vitex yaundensis is a species of plant in the family Lamiaceae. It is endemic to Cameroon. Its natural habitat is subtropical or tropical moist lowland forests. It is threatened by habitat loss.

References

yaundensis
Endemic flora of Cameroon
Critically endangered plants
Taxonomy articles created by Polbot